B-flat major is a major scale based on B, with pitches B, C, D, E, F, G, and A. Its key signature has two flats. Its relative minor is G minor and its parallel minor is B-flat minor.

The B-flat major scale is:

Many transposing instruments are pitched in B-flat major, including the clarinet, trumpet, tenor saxophone, and soprano saxophone. As a result, B-flat major is one of the most popular keys for concert band compositions.

History 

Joseph Haydn's Symphony No. 98 is often credited as the first symphony written in that key, including trumpet and timpani parts. However, his brother Michael Haydn wrote one such symphony earlier, No. 36. Nonetheless, Joseph Haydn still gets credit for writing the timpani part at actual pitch with an F major key signature (instead of transposing with a C major key signature), a procedure that made sense since he limited that instrument to the tonic and dominant pitches. Many editions of the work use no key signature and specify the instrument as "Timpani in B–F".

Notable classical compositions

 François Couperin
 Les Barricades Mystérieuses
 Johann Sebastian Bach
 Brandenburg Concerto No. 6
 Luigi Boccherini
 Cello Concerto No. 9, G. 482
 Joseph Haydn
 Symphony No. 85 (La Reine)
 Symphony No. 98
 Symphony No. 102
 Sinfonia Concertante for Violin, Cello, Oboe and Bassoon
 String Quartet Op. 76 No. 4 (Sunrise)
 Wolfgang Amadeus Mozart
 Symphony No. 5
 Symphony No. 24
 Symphony No. 33
 Piano Concerto No. 6
 Piano Concerto No. 15
 Piano Concerto No. 18
 Piano Concerto No. 27
 String Quintet No. 1
 String Quartet No. 17 (Hunt)
 Violin Sonata No. 32
 Piano Sonata No. 3
 Piano Sonata No. 13 (Linz)
 Piano Sonata No. 17
 Ludwig van Beethoven
 Piano Concerto No. 2
 Symphony No. 4
 String Quartet No. 6
 String Quartet No. 13
 Große Fuge
 Piano Sonata No. 11
 Piano Sonata No. 29 (Hammerklavier)
 Piano Trio No. 7 (Archduke)
 Franz Schubert
 Impromptu No. 3, Op. 142
 Mass No. 3
 Piano Sonata No. 21, D. 960
 Piano Trio No. 1, D. 898
 Symphony No. 2
 Symphony No. 5
 Felix Mendelssohn
 Symphony No. 2 (Lobgesang)
 String Quintet No. 2
 Cello Sonata No. 1
 Frédéric Chopin
 Variations on "Là ci darem la mano" for piano and orchestra, opus 2
 Mazurka Op. 7, No. 1
 Prelude Op. 28, No. 21 "Sunday"
 Polonaise Op. 71, No. 2
 Robert Schumann
 Symphony No. 1, Op. 38, (Frühling)
 The second, fourth and sixth movement of Kreisleriana, Op. 16
 Humoreske for piano, Op. 20
 Faschingsschwank aus Wien for piano, Op. 26
 Anton Bruckner
 Symphony No. 5
 Johannes Brahms
 Piano Concerto No. 2
 String Quartet No. 3
 String Sextet No. 1
 Variations and Fugue on a Theme by Handel
Variations on a Theme by Haydn
 Bohuslav Martinů
 Symphony no. 1
 Sergei Prokofiev
 Symphony No. 5
 Piano Concerto No. 4
 Piano Sonata No. 7
 Dmitri Shostakovich
 String Quartet No. 5
 Ottorino Respighi
 Pines of Rome

References

External links
 

Musical keys
Major scales